Leonid Gomerovich Lazaridi (born 17 April 1980) is a former Russian football player.

References

1980 births
Living people
Russian footballers
FC Zhemchuzhina Sochi players
Russian Premier League players
FC Sibir Novosibirsk players
Association football defenders
FC Rubin Kazan players
FC Chernomorets Novorossiysk players
FC Mashuk-KMV Pyatigorsk players